South Punjab or Saraikistan (Urdu) is a proposed new province of Pakistan, comprising the areas which has a majority of Saraikis in the southern part of Punjab province. Made up of Bahawalpur Division, Multan Division, Dera Ghazi Khan Division and Dera Ismail Khan Division of Khyber Province, and 5 other districts of Punjab with total of 22 districts that are Saraiki majority areas. Few districts can also be taken from Balochistan province. The proposed South Punjab or Saraikistan forms about 52 percent of the total area and almost 40 percent of the population of Punjab province. South Punjab or Saraikistan has a population of around 40 million as of 2017 and is estimated to be around 50 million in 2023.

History
In 2012, Punjab Provincial Assembly and the National Assembly passed resolutions for the creation of new province in Punjab. These resolutions were supported by the Pakistan Peoples Party (PPP) and Pakistan Muslim League (N) (PMLN) and was passed.

In 2013 election the PPP tried to mobilize the Seraiki voters over the Saraikistan province creation. But they got only one National Assembly seat from the Saraikistan region.

In 2018 the Pakistan Tehreek-e-Insaf (PTI) promised to create a new province in South Punjab within the first 100 days of taking office, if they win. PTI won the election and won 30 out of 50 seats of the National Assembly seats in South Punjab.  On August 15, 2018, the PTI MPA of Punjab Assembly, Mohsin Leghari tabled a resolution for the creation of a new province in South Punjab.

In 2022 the Senate accepted a bill seeking creation of South Punjab province on 18 January, and was supported by the Pakistan Tehreek-i-Insaf (PTI) and Pakistan Peoples Party (PPP).

Establishment of Separate Administrative Secretariat
In 2020, a separate secretariat was established for southern areas of Punjab (Saraikistan). The secretariat is made up of Dera Ghazi Khan Division, Multan Division and Bahawalpur Division. It became officially operational on 15 October 2020. 
Initially the departments of Services and General administration (S & GAD), Home department, Health, Education, Agriculture, Planning and Development, Live stock and dairy development, Local government and community development, Housing, urban development and Public health engineering, Irrigation, Forest, Communication and works, Revenue and Police  are included in the separate Administrative Secretariat of Saraikistan region with following officers:
 (i) Zahid Akhtar Zaman, June 30, 2020, to March 3, 2021 (ii) Saif Anjum, March 10, 2021, to April 11, 2021 (iii) Captain Retd Saqib Zafar, April 12, 2021, to till now, Additional Chief Secretary, South Punjab
 (i)Captain (Retd) Zafar Iqbal, September 2020 to March 2022 (ii) Dr Ehsan Sadiq  March 15, 2022 to December 27, 2022 (iii) Sahibzada Muhammad Shehzad Sultan, December 27, 2022 to till now, Additional Inspector General of Police, South Punjab
 Momin Agha, Secretary Home department
 Nosheen Malik, Secretary S & GAD
 Dr. Ahtasham Anwar, Secretary Education
 Muhammad Ajmal Bhatti, Secretary Health
 Rana Ubaidullah Anwar, Secretary Finance
 Shoaib Iqbal Syed, Secretary Planning and Development
 Rana Khurram Shehzad Umar, Secretary Local government and community development
 Liaqat Ali Chatha, Secretary Housing, Urban development and Public health engineering
 Saqib Ali Ateel, Secretary Agriculture
 Aftab Ahmad Pirzada, Secretary Live stock and dairy development

Geography
The Saraikistan Qaumi Council demanded the creation of Saraikistan province by merging 24 districts in South Punjab and 2 districts in Khyber Pakhtunkhwa (Dera Ismail Khan and Tank districts, there 70 percent of the people speaks Seraiki).. Other Saraiki districts include Sahiwal, Mianwali, Bhakkar, Jhang, Toba Tek Singh. Roughly 22 districts could be included in South Punjab province. Few districts can also be taken from Balochistan province bordering Punjab.

The Main Political parties PTI, PPP and PML(N) have difference on the geography of Saraikistan. The PPP supports the formation of the South province by merging 14 districts of Punjab and 2 districts of Khyber Pakhtunkhwa. The PTI supports the formation of the South Punjab province by merging 11 districts of South Punjab only. The PML(N) does not much support the division of Punjab in to two separate provinces.

Administration Division 
The province would have four or more administrative divisions and 22 districts:

Demographics

Language

The major native language spoken in the South Punjab is Saraiki and mostly spoken in most parts of South Punjab, Punjabi also popular in eastern part of Bahawalpur Division, Urdu is widely used as a lingua franca in official.

Religion
Saraiki, Punjabi and Baloch people in South Punjab believe Islam, most are Sunnis.

See also 
 Bahawalpur South Punjab, another proposed province in this region
 Qabailistan, a proposed province in western Khyber Pakhtunkhwa, Pakistan
 Saraiki culture

References

Bibliography 

 
Proposed provinces and territories of Pakistan
Provincial disputes in Pakistan
Regions of Pakistan